Sekba or sometimes called bektim is a Chinese Indonesian pork offal stewed in a mild soy sauce-based soup. The stew tastes mildly sweet and salty, made from soy sauce, garlic, and Chinese herbs. It is a popular fare street food in Indonesian Chinatowns, such as Gloria alley, Glodok Chinatown in Jakarta, Indonesia.

Variations 
As a street food fare, customer might choose the type of pork offals in their dish, and they will be charged accordingly. Other than pork meat, the types of pork offals being offered as sekba are pig's ears, tongue, liver, tripe, intestines and lungs. The prices of each pieces of pork offals ranged between Rp 5,000 to Rp 15,000. A personal portion usually contains three types of offals or meat. Vegetables, such as boiled potatoes, salted vegetables, tofu, and sometimes hard boiled eggs may also be added.

See also

 Babi kecap
 Bak Kut Teh
 Phá lấu 
 Lou mei 
 Pig's organ soup
 List of stews
 Semur

References

External links 
 
 Sekba recipes (in Indonesian)

Indonesian Chinese cuisine
Pork dishes